Chen Shaokuan (October 7, 1889 – July 30, 1969) was a Chinese Fleet Admiral who served as the senior commander of Chinese naval forces of the National Revolutionary Army during the Second Sino-Japanese War and World War II.

Early life and career

Chen Shaokuan was born on 7 October 1889 in Chengmen Village (now Chengmenzhen) in Min County, Fuzhou. Chen's father served in the Imperial Chinese Navy, originally having a career in carpenting. He took an interest to his father's occupation, attending the Jiangnan Naval Academy in Nanjing at the age of 17. At 20 years old he graduated from the academy and was assigned to the training cruiser Tongji, then in 1910 he served aboard the Jingqing. Rising up the ranks, he was promoted to Lieutenant Commander on the eve of World War I in 1914, now serving for the navy of the Republic of China.

World War I
Since China was mainly neutral during WW1, Chen had limited involvement in the war. In an event unrelated to the war, he was once again promoted, this time as a commander, now assigned to the Zhaohe. He witnessed naval combat for the first time after visiting the United States and United Kingdom onboard British warships despite the many dangers that he would have faced at the time. Chen also served as a naval attaché to France, Italy and the United Kingdom.

Interwar period
Chen Shaokuan joined the National Revolutionary Army in 1927, becoming Deputy Director of the Navy Department in 1929, then head of the Navy Department in 1932. He also served as a member of the Military Affairs Commission of the National Government and an executive member of the Central Committee of the KMT.

Second Sino-Japanese War
With the start of the Second Sino-Japanese War in 1937, Chen worked to organize waterborne and coastal defenses, including closing off the Yangtze River, for the protection of the capital of Nanjing. In 1938, he was promoted to Commander-in-Chief of the Navy. After the National Government moved its capital to Chongqing, he actively organized navy guerrillas behind enemy lines to fight the enemy and cooperate with the various battlefield operations throughout the country.

He was relieved from duty by Chiang Kai-shek in 1945 after unsuccessfully attempting to request for peaceful conclusions to conflicts during the Chinese Civil War and budget for building aircraft carriers for the Republic of China Navy. Towards the end of the Civil War in April 1949, it was reported that Zhu Shaoliang asked Chen to retreat to Taiwan with the remnants of the Republic of China and Chen persistently refused his offer.

Establishment of the People's Republic of China
After the establishment of the People's Republic of China in 1949, Chen Shaokuan was appointed as a member of the East China Military and Political Committee, Vice Chairman of the Fujian Provincial People's Government, Vice Governor, Vice Chairman of the People's Revolution Central Committee, etc., and was elected as a representative of the first, second and third National People's Congress, a member of the Plenipotentiary, and a member of the National Defense Committee of the People's Republic of China.

In 1969, he died of stomach cancer at the age of 80.

External links
http://ww2db.com/person_bio.php?person_id=704

Republic of China Navy admirals
Chinese military personnel of World War II
People's Republic of China politicians from Fujian
1889 births
1969 deaths
Politicians from Fuzhou
Generals from Fujian
Admirals of World War II